Banoak (also known as Corinth) is an unincorporated community in Catawba County, North Carolina, United States.

References

Unincorporated communities in Catawba County, North Carolina
Unincorporated communities in North Carolina